Clifford Heatherley Lamb (8 October 1888 in Preston, Lancashire – 15 September 1937 in London) was an English stage and film actor.

Filmography

 Henry VIII (1911)
 Bleak House (1920)
 The Tavern Knight (1920)
 The Mystery of Mr. Bernard Brown (1921)
 The Autumn of Pride (1921)
 Mademoiselle from Armentieres (1926)
 The Sea Urchin (1926)
 The King's Highway (1927)
 The Rolling Road (1927)
 Boadicea (1927)
 Roses of Picardy (1927)
 Tesha (1928)
 The Passing of Mr. Quin (1928)
 The Constant Nymph (1928)
 Champagne (1928)
 High Treason (1929)
 Splinters (1929)
 The W Plan (1930)
 The Compulsory Husband (1930)
 Symphony in Two Flats (1930)
 Who Killed Doc Robin? (1931)
 Glamour (1931)
 The Love Habit (1931)
 Brother Alfred (1932)
 Fires of Fate (1932)
 Goodnight, Vienna (1932)
 After the Ball (1932)
 The Indiscretions of Eve (1932)
 Help Yourself (1932)
 Happy Ever After (1932)
 Yes, Mr Brown (1933)
 The Little Damozel (1933)
 I Adore You (1933)
 Forging Ahead (1933)
 Discord (1933)
 Beware of Women (1933)
 Smithy (1933)
 Bitter Sweet (1933)
 Cash (1933)
 Trouble in Store (short) (1934)
 The Private Life of Don Juan (1934)
 The Church Mouse (1934)
 The Rise of Catherine the Great (1934)
 The Queen's Affair (1934)
 Get Your Man (1934)
 Abdul the Damned (1935)
 The Invader (1935)
 No Monkey Business (1935)
 A Little Bit of Bluff (1935)
 Adventure Ltd. (1935)
 Cafe Mascot (1936)
 Reasonable Doubt (1936)
 Show Flat (1936)
 If I Were Rich (1936)
 Keep Your Seats, Please (1936)
 There Was a Young Man (1937)
 Don't Get Me Wrong (1937)
 It's Not Cricket (1937)
 Feather Your Nest (1937)

Stage appearances
 Little Nellie Kelly (London production, 1923)
 The Desert Song (Drury Lane London production, 1927)
 Glamorous Night (Drury Lane, 1935)

References

External links

1888 births
1937 deaths
English male stage actors
English male film actors
English male silent film actors
Actors from Preston, Lancashire
20th-century English male actors